Tyrolit is an Austrian company that develops, manufactures and markets abrasive products as well as concrete sawing and drilling equipment. With 29 production locations on 5 continents, the TYROLIT group belongs to the world’s largest producers of bonded abrasives. The company is based in Schwaz, Tyrol, Austria. TYROLIT, a registered trademark, was named after the mineral Tyrolite, first described in 1845 in Tyrol.

History 
Tyrolit was cofounded on February 13, 1919, by Daniel Swarovski to manufacture grinding wheels for the production of Swarovski crystals. During World War I, the Swarovski Group was cut off from supplies of grinding wheels, and was thus forced to develop and produce its own grinding wheels. After the war, it was decided to commercialize this activity and to start a separate company: thus, Tyrolit was born.
In 1950, the company relocated from the Swarovski Headquarters in Wattens to a new location in Schwaz. One of the largest drivers of growth of the company was the market launch of the glass fiber reinforced cutoff and grinding wheel SECUR in 1952. The glass fiber reinforcement greatly improved the security of the tools against centrifugal breakage.
In 1991 Tyrolit acquired both the US company Diamond Products and the Swiss company Hydrostress. These acquisitions added significant presence in the market for concrete drilling and sawing systems.
Further major acquisitions took place in 2004 with the purchasing of the Czech company Carborundum Electrite, in 2009 with the purchasing of the US company Radiac and in 2014 with the purchasing of the South African company Grinding Techniques.

Organization 
The Tyrolit Group is organized in four divisions:
 Metal / Precision – serves the metal fabrication and precision machining markets
 Construction – serves the construction industry
 Stone / Ceramics / Glass – serves the stone, ceramic tile and glass industries
 Industrial Trade – sells stock articles such as cutoff wheels through industrial distributors

Brands 
The Tyrolit Group operates under the following brands:
 Tyrolit: Global brand for all grinding solutions
 Tyrolit Hydrostress: drilling and sawing equipment for the construction industry
 Tyrolit Vincent: Milling, profiling and polishing tools for the stone, ceramic tile and glass industries
 Radiac: US producer of conventional bonded and superabrasive grinding wheels
 Diamond Products: US producer of diamond tools and equipment for the construction industry
 Burka Kosmos: German producer of conventional bonded grinding wheels 	
 Carborundum Electrite: Czech producer of conventional bonded grinding wheels
 Grinding Techniques: South African producer of conventional bonded grinding wheels

References

External links 
 Tyrolit
 Radiac Abrasives
 Diamond Products
 Burka-Kosmos
 Grinding Techniques

Categories 

Tool manufacturing companies of Austria
Power tool manufacturers
Engineering companies of Austria
Austrian companies established in 1919
Austrian brands
Manufacturing companies established in 1919